Souleyman Diabate (born 23 March 1991) is a Malian professional footballer who plays as a striker for Bangladeshi club Dhaka Mohammedan.

Club career
He played for Can Tho F.C. from 2010 to 2014 and Long An F.C. until 2016. He returned to Mali to play for Asom in 2017–18. In May 2019, he signed for Mohammedan Sporting Club in the Bangladesh Premier League.

Personal life

Via Facebook, he met Truc Linh. At first she was hesitant but after she got acquainted with him they fell in love, marrying in 2015.

References

External links
 

1991 births
Living people
Malian footballers
Association football forwards
Can Tho FC players
Long An FC players
Mohammedan SC (Dhaka) players
Malian expatriate footballers
V.League 1 players
Bangladesh Premier League players

Expatriate footballers in Vietnam
Malian expatriate sportspeople in Vietnam
Expatriate footballers in Bangladesh
Malian expatriate sportspeople in Bangladesh
Bangladesh Football Premier League players